The Fondation de France ("Foundation of France") is an independent administrative agency which was established by the French government in an effort to stimulate and foster the growth of private philanthropy and private foundations in France. In the modern day the organisation brings together donors, founders, and volunteers from across France to provide effective support to a number of charitable causes with the aim to support sustainable solutions for the advancement of society.

Description
The Foundation was established in 1969. Its focus is the elderly, the disabled, children, health, medical and scientific research, culture and the environment. Notable presidents of the foundation include Maurice Schumann (1973–1974), Roger Seydoux de Clausonne (1975–1983) and Hubert Curien (1998–2000). It is a member of the Network of European Foundations for Innovative Cooperation (NEF) and Philea - Philanthropy Europe Association.

On August 4, 2020, the Fondation de France launched an appeal for donations following the double explosion that destroyed the port of Beirut, the capital of Lebanon.

References

Further reading
 Pavillon, Emmanuelle. (1995).  La Fondation de France: 1969-1994 : l'invention d'un mécénat contemporain. Paris: Anthropos. ;

External links
 Fondation de France official website (French);  (English)

Non-profit organizations based in France
Foundations based in France
1969 establishments in France